Common Dead is an American thrash/groove metal band from Chicago. The band is part of the new wave of American heavy metal.

History 
Common Dead is classified as melodic death metal by various sources, although the band touches on melodic thrash metal, groove metal, and alternative metal influences. Andrew Laurenson is the band's sole proprietor and has performed all instrumentation for all recorded efforts thus far. He plays lead/rhythm guitar and vocals for live occasions.

Common Dead debuted with a self-titled album in 2009.  In an interview with Metal-Rules.com, Laurenson commented that the band revolves around a melodic guitar influence and raw, forthright vocals. A four-track EP was released in January 2011 entitled Interim Flesh, which experimented with industrial metal influences not typical of the band's style. The EP scored warm praise from critics.

The band released an album Diatribe in February 2012. It was met with generally positive reviews from numerous sources. The band has so far released three music videos for songs from this album. One titled "Critical Mass" was broadcast on Underground Video TV. The following year, the album Allegorize was released.

Metal Underground interviewed the band after a raw mix for a Fear Factory cover came out on YouTube. Common Dead recorded a cover for "Flashpoint" as one instrumentalist. They also announced that new members would be joining the band for live performances. A break in activity was confirmed in 2013 as Laurenson moved towards other projects.

Discography 
 Common Dead (full-length, 2009)
 Interim Flesh (EP, 2011)
 Come Get Some: Alternate Studio Version (Single, 2011)
 Diatribe (full-length, 2012)
 Allegorize (full-length, 2013)

References 

American melodic death metal musical groups
American thrash metal musical groups
Musical groups established in 2009